Untitled is an outdoor 1987 granite sculpture by Ulrich Rückriem, installed outside the Art Institute of Chicago, in the U.S. state of Illinois.

See also
 1987 in art
 List of public art in Chicago

References

1987 sculptures
Granite sculptures in Illinois
Outdoor sculptures in Chicago
Sculptures of the Art Institute of Chicago